Friedrich Berger (5 December 1894, in Vienna, Austria – ?) was an Austrian-born actor. He settled in London and also worked for an advertising agency's art filing department during the 1970s and 1980s.

Filmography
 Auf den Trummern des Paradieses (1920) – Obeidullah
 The Golden Plague (1921) – Det. James Clifford
 Swifter Than Death (1925) – Eric Holsen
 The Perfect Woman (1949) – Farini
 Cordula (1950)
 One Wild Oat (1951) – Samson
 Lady Godiva Rides Again (1951) – Mr Green
 The Woman's Angle (1952) – (uncredited)
 Top Secret (1952) – Russian Doctor
 No Time for Flowers (1952) – Anton Novotny
 The Case of Gracie Budd (1953) – Hermann Schneider 
 To Dorothy a Son (1954) – Furrier

References

External links
 The BFI Film & Television Database
 

1894 births
Austrian male film actors
Austrian male silent film actors
Year of death unknown
20th-century Austrian male actors
Austrian emigrants to the United Kingdom